This article lists the confirmed squads for the 2002 Men's Hockey World Cup tournament to be held in Kuala Lumpur, Malaysia between 24 February and 9 March 2002.

Pool A

Argentina
The following players were named for the Argentina team.

Head coach: Jorge Ruiz

Belgium
The following players were named for the Belgium team.

Head coach: Giles Bonnet

Germany
The following players were named for the Germany team.

Head Coach: Bernhard Peters

Netherlands
The following players were named for the Netherlands team.

Head coach: Joost Bellaart

New Zealand
The following players were named for the New Zealand team.

Head Coach: Kevin Towns

Pakistan
The following players were named for the Pakistan team.

Head Coach: Abdul Khan

South Africa
The following players were named for the South Africa team.

Head coach: Rob Pullen

Spain
The following players were named for the Spain team.

Head coach: Toni Forrellat

Pool B

Australia
The following players were named for the Australia team.

Head coach: Barry Dancer

Cuba
The following players were named for the Cuba team.

Head coach: Guillermo Stakeman

England
The following players were named for the England team.

Head coach: Malcolm Wood

India
The following players were named for the India team.

Head coach: Cedric D'Souza

Japan
The following players were named for the Japan team.

Head coach: Manabu Yamanaka

Malaysia
The following players were named for the Malaysia team.

Head coach: Paul Lissek

Poland
The following players were named for the Poland team.

Head coach: Jerzy Joskowiak

South Korea
The following players were named for the South Korea team.

Head coach: Kim Young-kyu

References

Squads
Men's Hockey World Cup squads